Tonganoxie (pronounced ) is a city in Leavenworth County, Kansas, United States and is part of the Kansas City metropolitan area.  As of the 2020 census, the population of the city was 5,573.

History
Tonganoxie was platted in 1866. It was named for a local Native American Chief from the Delaware Tribe whose name means "shorty" in the Delaware language. Tonganoxie was incorporated as a city in 1871.

Geography
Tonganoxie is located at  (39.108880, -95.086885).

Climate
The climate in this area is characterized by hot, humid summers and generally cold winters.  According to the Köppen Climate Classification system, Tonganoxie has a humid subtropical climate, abbreviated "Cfa" on climate maps.

Demographics

2010 census
As of the census of 2010, there were 4,996 people, 1,884 households, and 1,338 families living in the city. The racial makeup of the city was 95.2% White, 1.0% African American, 0.7% Native American, 0.4% Asian, 0.1% Pacific Islander, 0.6% from other races, and 2.0% from two or more races. Hispanic or Latino of any race were 3.8% of the population.

There were 1,884 households, of which 41.1% had children under the age of 18 living with them, 52.8% were married couples living together, 12.8% had a female householder with no husband present, 5.5% had a male householder with no wife present, and 29.0% were non-families. 23.8% of all households were made up of individuals, and 9.9% had someone living alone who was 65 years of age or older. The average household size was 2.61 and the average family size was 3.08.

The median age in the city was 32.5 years. 29.3% of residents were under the age of 18; 7.7% were between the ages of 18 and 24; 29.9% were from 25 to 44; 21.2% were from 45 to 64; and 11.8% were 65 years of age or older. The gender makeup of the city was 47.9% male and 52.1% female.

2000 census
As of the census of 2000, there were 2,728 people, 999 households, and 737 families living in the city. The racial makeup of the city was 95.2% White, 1.2% African American, 0.9% Native American, 0.4% Asian, 0.3% Pacific Islander, 0.7% from other races, and 1.4% from two or more races. Hispanic or Latino of any race were 2.3% of the population.

There were 999 households, out of which 42.0% had children under the age of 18 living with them, 57.6% were married couples living together, 11.8% had a female householder with no husband present, and 26.2% were non-families. 22.9% of all households were made up of individuals, and 11.6% had someone living alone who was 65 years of age or older. The average household size was 2.65 and the average family size was 3.13.

In the city, the population was spread out, with 30.0% under the age of 18, 9.5% from 18 to 24, 30.0% from 25 to 44, 17.1% from 45 to 64, and 13.4% who were 65 years of age or older. The median age was 32 years. For every 100 females, there were 91.8 males. For every 100 females age 18 and over, there were 87.9 males.

The median income for a household in the city was $44,278, and the median income for a family was $49,960. Males had a median income of $37,301 versus $24,028 for females. The per capita income for the city was $18,026. About 4.5% of families and 6.0% of the population were below the poverty line, including 5.5% of those under age 18 and 9.9% of those age 65 or over.

Education
Tonganoxie has one high school, a middle school, and one new elementary school. The high school teams are named the Chieftains, while middle school teams are known as the Warriors and the elementary school's mascot is the Braves.

Economy
Peruvian Connection is based in Tonganoxie.

In September 2017, Tyson Foods cancelled plans to build a $320,000,000 chicken processing plant in Tonganoxie after objections from local residents.

Government
Tonganoxie utilizes a modified Council–manager form of government. The city mayor along with five council members are elected at-large and serve four-year terms. Appointments of the municipal judge, city attorney, city clerk, and city treasurer are recommended by the mayor and confirmed by the city council. As of January 2020, the current mayor is David Frese and the current city manager is George Brajkovic.

Notable people

References

Further reading

External links
 City of Tonganoxie
 Tonganoxie - Directory of Public Officials
 Tonganoxie city map, KDOT

Cities in Kansas
Cities in Leavenworth County, Kansas
Populated places established in 1866
1866 establishments in Kansas